Alexander Nove, FRSE, FBA (born Aleksandr Yakovlevich Novakovsky; ; also published under Alec Nove; 24 November 1915 – 15 May 1994) was a Professor of Economics at the University of Glasgow and a noted authority on Russian and Soviet economic history. According to Ian D. Thatcher, "[T]he consensus is that he was one of the most significant scholars of 'Soviet' studies in its widest sense and beyond."

Biography
Alexander Nove was born in Saint Petersburg, Russia the son of Jacob Novakovsky. 

He was educated at King Alfred School in London and received a BSc in economics from the London School of Economics in 1936. The school later made him an Honorary Fellow in 1982.

He served in the Royal Signal Corps from 1939 but was transferred to Military Intelligence until 1946, reaching the rank of Major. From 1947 to 1958, he worked in Civil Service, mainly the Board of Trade. He was a Reader in Russian Social and Economic Studies at the University of London from 1958 to 1963 and Professor of Economics at the University of Glasgow from 1963 to 1982. He was then Emeritus Professor and Honorary Senior Research Fellow at Glasgow until his death.

In 1982 he was elected a Fellow of the Royal Society of Edinburgh. His proposers were William Hugh Clifford Frend, Sydney Checkland, Thomas Wilson, George Wyllie, Sir Kenneth Alexander and Leslie Alcock. 

Nove died in Voss, Norway on 15 May 1994.

Family

In 1951 he married Irene MacPherson, his second marriage. They had three sons: Perry and David, from his first marriage. Together they had Charles Nove (born 1960), a broadcaster.

Publications
 The Soviet Economy (1961)
 (with J. A. Newth) The Soviet Middle East (1965)
 Was Stalin Really Necessary? (1965)
 Economic History of the USSR (1969, 3rd edn 1993 online free to borrow)
 (ed. with D. M. Nuti) Socialist Economics (1972)
 Efficiency Criteria for Nationalised Industries (1973)
 Stalinism and After (1976)
 The Soviet Economic System (1977, 3rd edn 1986)
 Political Economy and Soviet Socialism (1979)
 The Economics of Feasible Socialism (1983)
 Socialism, Economics and Development (1986)
 Glasnost in Action (1989)
 Economics of Feasible Socialism Revisited (1991)
 Studies in Economics and Russia (1991)
 An Economic History of the USSR 1917-1991 (London, Penguin 1992)
 (ed.) The Stalin Phenomenon (1993)

References

Sources
 Who's Who (UK)

External links

1915 births
1994 deaths
Academics of the University of Glasgow
Academics of the University of London
Alumni of the London School of Economics
British economists
Civil servants in the Board of Trade
Fellows of the Royal Society of Edinburgh
Fellows of the British Academy
Jewish historians
Jewish scientists
Russian Jews
Historians of Russia
20th-century British historians
British Army personnel of World War II
Royal Corps of Signals officers
Soviet emigrants to the United Kingdom